Nasir Mosque is the first purpose-built mosque in Hartlepool, located on Brougham Terrace. The mosque was built by the Ahmadiyya Muslim Community and inaugurated in 2005 by Mirza Masroor Ahmad, the Head of the Worldwide Ahmadiyya Muslim Community. The mosque participates in several local community events and provides regular services for the wider community.

During the opening session, town dignitaries such as Hartlepool MP Iain Wright and Hartlepool Borough Council's chief executive Paul Walker were in attendance. As a gesture, the Ahmadiyya Muslim Association, the main organisation behind the project, donated around £20,000 to local charities and causes, including Hartlepool and District Hospice, Butterwick Children's Hospice and Brougham Primary School.

External links

Photo of Nasir Mosque on Flickr

References

Mosques in England
Ahmadiyya mosques in the United Kingdom
Buildings and structures in Hartlepool
Mosques completed in 2005